In mathematics, the method of Frobenius, named after Ferdinand Georg Frobenius, is a way to find an infinite series solution for a second-order ordinary differential equation of the form

in the vicinity of the regular singular point . 

The Frobenius method enables one to create a power series solution to such a differential equation, provided that p(z) and q(z) are themselves analytic at 0 or, being analytic elsewhere, both their limits at 0 exist (and are finite).

Explanation 

The method of Frobenius is to seek a power series solution of the form

Differentiating:

Substituting the above differentiation into our original ODE:

The expression

is known as the indicial polynomial, which is quadratic in r. The general definition of the indicial polynomial is the coefficient of the lowest power of z in the infinite series. In this case it happens to be that this is the rth coefficient but, it is possible for the lowest possible exponent to be r − 2, r − 1 or, something else depending on the given differential equation. This detail is important to keep in mind. In the process of synchronizing all the series of the differential equation to start at the same index value (which in the above expression is k = 1), one can end up with complicated expressions.  However, in solving for the indicial roots attention is focused only on the coefficient of the lowest power of z.

These coefficients must be zero, since they should be solutions of the differential equation, so

satisfies

If the difference between the roots is not an integer, we get another, linearly independent solution in the other root.

Example 
Let us solve 

Divide throughout by z2 to give

which has the requisite singularity at z = 0.

Use the series solution

Now, substituting

From  we get a double root of 1.

hence we have the recurrence relation:

Given some initial conditions, we can either solve the recurrence entirely or obtain a solution in power series form.

Since the ratio of coefficients  is a rational function, the power series can be written as a generalized hypergeometric series.

Roots separated by an integer
The previous example involved an indicial polynomial with a repeated root, which gives only one solution to the given differential equation.  In general, the Frobenius method gives two independent solutions provided that the indicial equation's roots are not separated by an integer (including zero).

If the root is repeated or the roots differ by an integer, then the second solution can be found using:

where  is the first solution (based on the larger root in the case of unequal roots),  is the smaller root, and the constant  and the coefficients  are to be determined. This then determines the rest of the  In some cases the constant  must be zero.

The roots of the indicial equation are −1 and 0. The solution  has a power series starting with the power zero. In a power series starting with  the recurrence relation places no restriction on the coefficient for the term  which can be set arbitrarily. If it is set to zero then with this differential equation all the other coefficients will be zero and we obtain the solution .

See also

Fuchs' theorem
Regular singular point
Laurent series

External links 
 
  (Draft version available online at https://www.mat.univie.ac.at/~gerald/ftp/book-ode/). Chapter 4 contains the full method including proofs.

Ordinary differential equations